The 1996–97 NBA season was the Grizzlies' second season in the National Basketball Association. Coming off of an NBA worst record of 15–67 in their first season, the Grizzlies had the third overall pick in the 1996 NBA draft, and selected Shareef Abdur-Rahim from the University of California. The team acquired Anthony Peeler and George Lynch from the Los Angeles Lakers, and signed free agent Lee Mayberry during the off-season. However, the Grizzlies continued to struggle in their second season, losing their first seven games, then posting an 8-game losing streak in January as head coach Brian Winters was fired after an 8–35 start, and was replaced with General Manager Stu Jackson. The Grizzlies held a 9–42 record at the All-Star break, then suffered a 15-game losing streak between February and March, and went on a nine-game losing streak between March and April, finishing last place in the Midwest Division with a league worst record of 14–68, their worst record in franchise history.

Abdur-Rahim averaged 18.7 points and 6.9 rebounds per game, and was named to the NBA All-Rookie First Team, and also finished in third place in Rookie of the Year voting, while second-year star Bryant Reeves showed improvement averaging 16.2 points and 8.1 rebounds per game, and Peeler provided the team with 14.5 points and 1.5 steals per game. In addition, Greg Anthony contributed 9.5 points, 6.3 assists and 2.0 steals per game, while Lynch provided with 8.3 points, 6.4 rebounds and 1.5 steals per game, but only played just 41 games due to an abdominal strain injury, and first round draft pick Roy Rogers led the team with 2.0 blocks per game.

Following the season, Anthony signed as a free agent with the Seattle SuperSonics, while Jackson was fired as head coach, Rogers was traded to the Boston Celtics, and Eric Mobley and second-year guard Lawrence Moten were both released to free agency.

Draft picks
The Grizzlies first draft pick was Shareef Abdur-Rahim, which was the third overall pick in the draft.

Roster

Roster Notes
Small forward Doug Edwards missed the entire season due to compartment syndrome.

Regular season
The Grizzlies would open the season with a seven-game losing streak before earning their first win, as they defeated the Phoenix Suns 92–89 in their eighth game.  Wins would be few and far between for Vancouver, as they finished the season with a 14–68 record, which was one game worse than their expansion season.  The Grizzlies also once again finished in last place in the league.

Highs
 The Grizzlies swept a season series for the first time in team history, as they won both of their games against the Boston Celtics.  The win against the Celtics was also the only time the Grizzlies won consecutive games during the season, as they defeated the San Antonio Spurs the previous game.
 Vancouver scored a season high 121 points in their final game of the season, as they defeated the Phoenix Suns 121–107.

Lows
 The Grizzlies lose their first seven games of the season, including a double OT loss to the Los Angeles Clippers in their seventh game.
 Vancouver gives up a season high 127 points in a 127–80 loss to the Indiana Pacers on December 4, 1996.
 After a 95–76 loss against the Minnesota Timberwolves on January 23, 1997, Vancouver fires head coach Brian Winters and general manager Stu Jackson takes over for the remainder of the season.
 On March 19, 1997, the Grizzlies lose their season high fifteenth straight game, as the Minnesota Timberwolves defeat Vancouver 95–72.

Season standings

Record vs. opponents

Game log

Player statistics

.

Awards and records
 Shareef Abdur-Rahim, First Team, NBA All-Rookie Team

Transactions
Vancouver would make a trade with the Los Angeles Lakers, as the Grizzlies would acquire Anthony Peeler and George Lynch along with the Lakers second round draft choices in 1997 and 1998 for Vancouver's second round draft choices in 1997 and 1998.  Peeler would start 57 games for the Grizzlies in the 1996–97 season and finish third in team scoring averaging 14.5 points per game.

References

 Grizzlies on Database Basketball
 Grizzlies on Basketball Reference

Van
Vancouver Grizzlies seasons